The 2019 Canadian federal election was held on October 21, 2019, to elect members of the House of Commons to the 43rd Canadian Parliament. The Liberal Party of Canada, having previously held a majority of the seats in the House, was returned with a minority of the seats, while the Conservative Party of Canada gained fewer seats than expected and the Bloc Québécois saw its standing revived in Quebec.

In this election there were 18,170,880 valid votes cast with 179,479 voters rejected, for total voter turnout of 67 percent of the 27,373,028 registered voters.

Summary

Campaign strategy was weak in most of the political parties. As one commentator remarked, "Never before have both major parties taken such a small share of the vote. Never before, in my memory, have both declined steadily and together throughout a campaign." While the Conservative share of the vote rose from 31.9 percent in 2015 to 34.4 percent in 2019, and saw its share of the popular vote rise in 194 of the ridings, its share of the vote fell In the remaining 144. The Liberals emerged from the election with a strategic advantage in seats in both Ontario and Quebec, and the Conservatives' weakness on election day may lead to questions about the future of its leader Andrew Scheer, but there is also discussion as to whether the Tories' shortfall is due to more systemic reasons, especially with respect to the urban/rural divide in the electorate.

Opinion polling was generally accurate, although in most polls support for the Liberals and Conservatives was mildly understated, while that for the Bloc and the Greens was overstated. Seats won fell within poll projections, but it was noted that at least eight seats expected to go to the NDP actually went Liberal, leading to the conjecture that the prior departure of their long-time NDP MPs revealed the underlying weakness of the party brand.

Synopsis of results

Results overview

Summary analysis

Change in popular vote

Results by province

Seats won and lost by party 

The following 62 seats (representing 18.34 percent of seats in the House of Commons) changed allegiance from the 2015 election:

 Liberal to Conservative (22)
Aurora—Oak Ridges—Richmond Hill
Calgary Centre
Calgary Skyview
Charleswood—St. James—Assiniboia—Headingley
Chicoutimi—Le Fjord
Cloverdale—Langley City
Edmonton Centre
Edmonton Mill Woods
Fundy Royal
Hastings—Lennox and Addington
Kelowna—Lake Country
Kenora
Kildonan—St. Paul
Mission—Matsqui—Fraser Canyon
New Brunswick Southwest
Northumberland—Peterborough South
Pitt Meadows—Maple Ridge
Regina—Wascana
Steveston—Richmond East
Tobique—Mactaquac
West Nova

 NDP to Bloc (11)
Abitibi—Baie-James—Nunavik—Eeyou
Abitibi—Témiscamingue
Beloeil—Chambly
Berthier—Maskinongé
Drummond
Jonquière
Longueuil—Saint-Hubert
Rimouski-Neigette—Témiscouata—Les Basques
Saint-Hyacinthe—Bagot
Salaberry—Suroît
Trois-Rivières
 Liberal to Bloc (8)
Avignon—La Mitis—Matane—Matapédia
La Prairie
Laurentides—Labelle
Montarville
Rivière-des-Mille-Îles
Saint-Jean
Shefford
Thérèse-De Blainville
 NDP to Conservative (6)
Desnethé—Missinippi—Churchill River
Essex
Kootenay—Columbia
Port Moody—Coquitlam
Regina—Lewvan
Saskatoon West

 NDP to Liberal (5)
Hochelaga
Laurier—Sainte-Marie
Outremont
Sherbrooke
Windsor—Tecumseh
 Liberal to NDP (3)
Nunavut
St. John's East
Winnipeg Centre
 Conservative to Bloc (3)
Beauport—Côte-de-Beaupré—Île d'Orléans—Charlevoix
Beauport—Limoilou
Lac-Saint-Jean
 Conservative to Liberal (2)
Kitchener—Conestoga
Milton
 Liberal to Green (1)
Fredericton
 NDP to Green (1)
Nanaimo—Ladysmith
 Liberal to Independent (1)
Vancouver Granville

The reasons for the changes were:

Defeated MPs

Open seats that changed hands
Of the 44 seats that were open at dissolution, 11 were won by candidates of non-incumbent parties:

Vacancies filled in earlier byelections

Three open seats were filled in earlier byelections, retained by the winners in the ensuing general election:

Two vacancies were filled in earlier byelections, but the winners failed to keep them in the general election. They were both upset votes in favour of the Liberals, where one subsequently returned to the previous party, while the other went to a third party.

MPs standing under a different political affiliation 
Leona Alleslev had previously crossed the floor from the Liberals to the Conservatives in 2018, and was subsequently re-elected as a Conservative. Jody Wilson-Raybould contested her seat as an Independent and won, after having been expelled from the Liberal caucus.

Swing analysis within the largest provinces

Voter demographics

Post-election analysis from Elections Canada
Elections Canada reported the following general characteristics of voter turnout in the election, compared to 2015:

From polling firms after Election Day

Per Ipsos

Per Leger

Per Abacus

Strategic voting and vote splitting
Strategic voting may have played a significant part in determining the results. A survey by Angus Reid, issued several days after the election, revealed that 23% of undecided voters did not make up their mind until election day. Of that number, 52% voted for the candidate and party they liked, while 48% voted based on who they disliked the least. Of all undecided voters, 45% cast their vote for the Liberals, while 25% supported the Conservatives. NDP voters were the least likely group to have made up their mind early on in the campaign. An Ipsos-Reid exit poll conducted on election day found that 26% of all voters made their choice as to try to ensure which party did not win, and the Liberals were the main beneficiary of such activity. (Apparently these decisions were based on perception of the local situation so the vote was used  - when used strategically - to try to produce the election of a local candidate not so well liked but definitely more liked than a competitor in that same district.)

Vote splitting skewed the results in many ridings. Vote splitting did not arise from multiple candidates of the same party running  in a district (as that did not happen anywhere in Canada in this election) but from like-minded candidates of different parties running in the same district. Thus this analysis is based on somewhat arbitrary grouping of votes of like-minded parties despite different party labels into single voting blocks. Vote-splitting mainly benefited the Conservatives in Ontario and Metro Vancouver, the Liberals in Quebec and the Maritimes, and the NDP in BC and Ontario outside the GTA, while the Bloc benefited from multiple splits in the federalist parties, a wide group of all the nation-wide parties that ran candidates in Quebec.  The seats affected (where 2nd and 3rd place votes combined were greater than what the 1st place candidate received) are summarized thus:

Closest victories and greatest landslides

The total of the nine close results where Liberal were elected means a shift of just slightly more than 3205 voters away from Liberal candidates in those ridings would have lost the Liberals nine seats and given the Conservatives nine more, making the Liberal minority government weaker than it already was. Approximately 3000 votes is already anything at all when the votes are counted in the millions.

Significant results among independent and minor party candidates
Those candidates not belonging to a major party, receiving more than 1,000 votes in the election, are listed below:

Ridings won in major cities

Notes and references

Notes

References

2019 Canadian federal election